This is a list of United States ambassadors to Laos. The United States established full diplomatic relations with Laos in 1955, following its full independence from France in 1954.

On 29 December 1961, during the Laotian Civil War, President John F. Kennedy made the Ambassador to Laos the de facto commander of U.S. military and paramilitary operations within the Kingdom of Laos for the length of the war.

Accounting for American personnel missing in Laos and clearing unexploded ordnance (UXO) from the wars in Indochina were the initial focuses of the post-1975 bilateral relationship. Since that time the relationship has broadened to include cooperation on a range of issues including counter-narcotics, health, child nutrition, environmental sustainability, trade liberalization, and English language training. This expansion in cooperation has accelerated since 2009, with the launch of the Lower Mekong Initiative (LMI), which serves as a platform to address complex, transnational development and policy changes in the Lower Mekong sub-region. The United States and Laos share a commitment to ensuring a prosperous and sustainable future for the Mekong sub-region.  In July 2012, Secretary of State Hillary Clinton visited Laos, marking the first visit by a Secretary of State since 1955.

A large part of U.S. bilateral assistance to Laos is devoted to improving health and child nutrition. The United States also helps improve trade policy in Laos, promotes sustainable development and biodiversity conservation, and works to strengthen the criminal justice system and law enforcement. The United States has provided significant support for clearance of UXO from the war, particularly cluster munitions, as well as for risk education and victims’ assistance.

Ambassadors

See also
Laos – United States relations
Foreign relations of Laos
Ambassadors of the United States

Notes

References
 Castle, Timothy N. (1993). At War in the Shadow of Vietnam: U.S. Military Aid to the Royal Lao Government 1955–1975. .

External links
United States Department of State: Background notes on Laos

 United States Department of State: Chiefs of Mission for Laos
 United States Department of State: Laos
 United States Embassy in Vientiane

Laos
 
United States